Charley Marouani (7 December 1926 – 29 July 2017) was a Tunisian impresario and talent agent.

Early life
Charley Marouani was born in 1926 in Sousse, Tunisia. He had a brother, Gilbert Marouani, who became a music producer. Their father, an olive oil taster, died in 1944, and Marouni emigrated to France.

Career
Marouani began his career as a photographer in Nice. He subsequently moved to Paris, where he became a talent agent alongside his uncle. His first client was Jacques Brel. Other clients included Barbara, Sylvie Vartan, Henri Salvador, Joe Dassin, Salvatore Adamo, Richard Anthony, Julien Clerc and Enrico Macias. In his 2011 memoir, he recounted many stories about his celebrity clients.

Marouani became a knight of the Legion of Honour in 2009.

Death
Marouani died on 29 July 2017 in Corsica, France, at the age of 90.

Works

References

External links
 

1926 births
2017 deaths
People from Sousse
Tunisian emigrants to France
Impresarios
Talent agents
21st-century memoirists
Chevaliers of the Légion d'honneur